All I See Is You is a 2016 psychological drama film directed by Marc Forster and written by Forster and Sean Conway. The film stars Blake Lively and Jason Clarke. It was screened in the Special Presentations section at the 2016 Toronto International Film Festival. The film was released by Open Road Films (the company's last film before 2020's Honest Thief) in around 250 theaters in the United States on October 27, 2017.

Plot
Married couple Gina (Blake Lively) and James (Jason Clarke) live happily despite Gina's dependence on James due to her being blind. James appears to enjoy the dependence, saying that it makes him feel special. As they try for a baby, Gina prepares for a cornea transplant, which will restore the sight in one of her eyes. The surgery is a success, and Gina embraces her newfound independence. Immediately, her sex life with James suffers. To put the spark back into their marriage, James books them a holiday to Spain, promising Gina that he has reserved the same hotel room they had on their honeymoon. Upon their arrival, Gina claims the room is not the same, which James denies. Gina is later proven to be correct.
During the trip, Gina is shown to be growing in independence and confidence while James is left behind, seemingly unable to connect to the version of her that no longer depends on him. Resentful of her diverted attention, James begins to show signs of possessiveness.

On their way to Barcelona, they attempt to have sex on a sleeper train. James, blindfolded, demands to know who Gina fantasizes about when she masturbates, seemingly doubtful when she answers that she only thinks of him. Gina finally reveals that she does think of other men. James later watches a video of the encounter, obsessed with his helplessness and Gina's emotionless face.

In Barcelona, Gina and James arrive at Gina's sister's house. One night, Gina visits a peep show with her sister and brother-in-law. James declines their invitation to join and appears uncomfortable when Gina's brother-in-law jokingly suggests that Gina may find someone better looking. While walking back to the house, Gina is groped by a stranger on the street, whom her brother-in-law punches. Back at her sister and brother-in-law's house, James is mad at Gina for embarrassing him in front of her sister when she got mad at him for not sticking up for her.

Back home in Thailand, Gina begins to have trouble with her vision: her eyes water unusually and her vision worsens. Confused and terrified by her returning blindness, Gina brings her eye drops to her doctor, who promises to test them for contamination. James learns that he is sterile but does not tell Gina.

While James purchases a new house at Gina's insistence, Gina begins to flirt with Daniel, an attractive man she had met at the public pool. When her dog overheats during a walk, Daniel offers to take them back to his home for water. There, he and Gina have sex. Gina later reveals to James that she is pregnant, unintentionally confirming her affair as she is unaware of James's infertility. James does not confront her. Similarly, when Gina learns from her doctor that her eye drops have been tampered with, she does not confront James. Their home is broken into and their dog is stolen.

Some time later, a visibly pregnant Gina is apparently having trouble with her vision, now in need of her old cane and aid from James.  She and James move into their new house. At one point, James tests Gina's blindness, intentionally hiding from her in her blind spot. He makes plans to meet her at a local school for a talent show in which she is performing. While he is gone, Gina receives an anonymous letter, written in crayon, which reveals that James was the one who staged the home invasion and released their dog. The writer claims to have rescued the dog but refuses to return it because "when I look into her eyes, she looks back at me, and that is called love."

James goes to their old apartment to collect the last of his and Gina's belongings. In the bathroom, he uncovers a stash of empty eye drop bottles. He realizes that Gina discovered his deception and secretly continued to obtain eye drops from the doctor, meaning that she has been faking her returning blindness. Gina confirms this when she looks directly at him during the talent show. Distraught, James drives home in tears, and seems to purposefully crash into an oncoming truck and dies.

After Gina gives birth, Gina and her baby see each other for the first time.

Cast
Blake Lively  as Gina
Jason Clarke as James
Ahna O'Reilly as Carla
Yvonne Strahovski as Karen
Wes Chatham as Daniel
Danny Huston as Doctor Hughes

Production
In February 2015, Blake Lively and Jason Clarke joined the cast of the film, with Marc Forster directing from the screenplay he co-wrote with Sean Conway. In June 2015, Yvonne Strahovski joined the cast of the film. The film was shot on location in Thailand (Bangkok and Phuket) and Spain (Barcelona and Bunol).

Release
In October 2016, Open Road Films acquired U.S distribution rights to the film, and set it for a release on August 4, 2017.  and then was pushed back again for a release date of October 27, 2017.

Reception

Box office
All I See Is You grossed $217,644 in North America and $460,506 in other countries for a worldwide total of $678,150, against a production budget of $30 million.

Critical response
On review aggregator Rotten Tomatoes, the film holds a "Rotten" 29% rating based on 56 reviews, with an average rating of 4.5/10. The site's critical consensus reads, "All I See Is You hints at a number of intriguing questions with its premise, but they dissolve in a stylish yet empty psychodrama that fails to connect." On Metacritic, the film has a score 43 out of 100, based on 25 critics, indicating "mixed or average reviews".

References

External links
 
 

2016 films
2016 psychological thriller films

2016 romantic drama films
2016 thriller drama films

2010s psychological drama films
2010s romantic thriller films
Adultery in films
American psychological drama films
American psychological thriller films
American romantic drama films
American romantic thriller films
American thriller drama films
Films about blind people
Films directed by Marc Forster
Films scored by Marc Streitenfeld
Films shot in Barcelona
Films shot in Bangkok
Films set in Bangkok
Films set in Barcelona
Open Road Films films
Thai drama films
Thai romance films
2010s English-language films
2010s American films